Villanueva is a town and municipality in the Department of Casanare, Colombia.

Notable residents
Braian Angola (born 1994), basketball player who plays for Galatasaray S.K. (men's basketball) of the Turkish Basketball Super League and Basketball Champions League.

External links
 Villanueva official website
 Government of Villanueva official website

References

Municipalities of Casanare Department